Ostra is a commune located in Suceava County, Bukovina, northeastern Romania. It is composed of two villages, namely Ostra and Tărnicioara.

Administration and local politics

Communal council 

The commune's current local council has the following political composition, according to the results of the 2020 Romanian local elections:

References

External links 

 Ostra.ro

Communes in Suceava County
Localities in Southern Bukovina